Vialonga is a genus of moths belonging to the subfamily Tortricinae of the family Tortricidae.

Species
Vialonga pallior Diakonoff, 1960
Vialonga polyantha Diakonoff, 1960

See also
List of Tortricidae genera

References

External links
Tortricid.net

Archipini
Tortricidae genera